William Rayian (born 13 May 1994) is a Kenyan athlete.

Rayian won a bronze medal as part of the Kenyan 4 x 400m relay team at the 2022 Commonwealth Games.

References

1994 births
Living people
Athletes (track and field) at the 2022 Commonwealth Games
Commonwealth Games medallists in athletics
Kenyan male sprinters
Commonwealth Games bronze medallists for Kenya
Medallists at the 2022 Commonwealth Games